Chapitola is a Union Parishad of Muradnagar Upazila, Comilla District, Chittagong, Bangladesh.

Administration

Chapitala Union Parishad is one of the largest union parishad in Muradnagar Upazila. This union parishad has 9 wards and 4 villages. The name of villages is

 Raja Chapitala has number 5, 6, 7, 8, 9 wards (Total 5 wards).
 Khapura has number 3 wards (Total 1 ward)
 Pushkonirpar has number 4 wards (Total 1 ward)
 Ulomoira has number 1 & 2 wards (Total 2 wards)

Political system
Chapitala Union Parishad has Nine members from all nine wards. They're main leader is Union Parishad Chairman. Every 5 years later people selected they're leadership. Currently Chapitala Union Parishad chairman name is Manik mia people called him Manik Chairman.

Chairman name : কাইয়ুম ভূঁইয়া  

 1 no wards member name :
 2 no wards member name :
 3 no wards member name :
 4 no wards member name :
 5 no wards member name : Abdul Kuddus Mia
 6 no wards member name :  বখতিয়ার ইসলাম     
 7 no wards member name : মোতালেব 
 8 no wards member name :
 9 no wards member name :

Education

Chapitala Union Parishad has

 Six Primary school
 Four private children school
 One high school (Wazifa Khatun High School)
 One College (Farid Uddin Degree College)
 16 Morning Madrasa

References

 http://www.lged.gov.bd/DistrictArea2.aspx?Area=UnionParishad&DistrictID=10
Upazilas of Comilla District